Gongdao is a town in Hanjiang District, Yangzhou, Jiangsu, China. , it administers three residential neighborhoods, Huayuan, Kuixing, and Chi'an, as well as the following 11 villages:
Taiping Village
Sangyuan Village
Ouyang Village
Chi'an Village
Guying Village
Hubin Village
Baishu Village
Nianqiao Village
Hexi Village
Sanjie Village
Hedong Village

References

Township-level divisions of Jiangsu
Hanjiang District, Yangzhou